The 2014–15 Scottish League One is the 20th season in the current format of 10 teams in the third-tier of Scottish football.

Teams
Peterhead and Stirling Albion were promoted respectively as 2013–14 Scottish League Two champions and 2013–14 Scottish League One play-off winners, whilst Greenock Morton were relegated from the 2013–14 Scottish Championship.

Stadia and locations

Personnel

League table

Results

First half of season

Second half of season

League One play-offs

The second bottom team in League one enters into a 4 team playoff with the teams from 2nd to 4th from League Two

Semi-finals
All times British Summer Time (UTC+1)

First leg

Second leg

Queen's Park win 3-2 on aggregate

Stenhousemuir win 4-2 on aggregate

Final
The two semi-final winners play-off over two legs . the winner is awarded a place in the 2015–16 Scottish League One

First leg

Second leg

Stenhousemuir win 2-1 on aggregate

Top scorers

References

Scottish League One seasons
3
3
Scot